Norwegian State Agriculture Bank is a defunct Norwegian government bank that lent money to investments within agriculture with mortgage in real estate. It was created on 5 February 1965 as a merger between Norges Hypotekbank, Norges Småbruks- og Bustadsbank and Driftskredittkassen for jorbruket. From 1 January 2000, its responsibilities were transferred to the Norwegian Industrial and Regional Development Fund and the Norwegian Agricultural Authority.

Defunct banks of Norway
Defunct government agencies of Norway
Agricultural organisations based in Norway
Banks established in 1965
Banks disestablished in 2000
Norwegian companies established in 1965
2000 disestablishments in Norway
Ministry of Agriculture and Food (Norway)